= Muhammad Machasin =

Muhammad Machasin is a professor of history of Islamic culture at the State Islamic University (UIN) Sunan Kalijaga in Yogyakarta, Indonesia. as well as a director of the Islamic Higher Education in Indonesia. He has been actively promoting interfaith dialogue and is a member of the board of the Asian Council on Religion and Peace.
